The Nestorian Evangelion (also known as  ['Life of Jesus Christ']; Paris, Bibliothèque nationale de France, MS syr. 344) is a 16th-century Church of the East gospel book which contains 18 illustrations depicting the life of Jesus Christ, with captions in Syriac (larger in size) and Armenian. The manuscript was donated by the Chaldean Catholic archbishop Addaï Scher to the Bibliothèque nationale de France in 1909.

Introduction 
The manuscript consists of 10 folios measuring 312 by 198 mm, f1r and f10v (f9v) are blank. According to Jules Leroy, this manuscript would be an illustrated section of a Syriac gospel book the MS Syriac  kept by the Chaldean Patriarchate of Mosul. The 18 illustrations would have been originally attached to the end of that gospel book of Mosul. If the belonging to the Gospel of Mosul is proven, this manuscript could date back to the year 1497 AD (1806 AG) and have been copied in the village of 'WRG, in the diocese of Siirt at the time of the patriarch Mar Simeon, and of Mar Yuḥanon, the bishop of Athel, by someone named Abraham who is the son of Dodo.

Illustrations 
The eighteen illustrations:

See also 
 Rabbula Gospels
 Syriac Bible of Paris

References

External links 
 Access to the completely digitised manuscript at gallica.bnf.fr

Gospel Books
Nestorian texts
Syriac manuscripts
Church of the East
16th-century biblical manuscripts
16th-century illuminated manuscripts
Bibliothèque nationale de France collections
Byzantine illuminated manuscripts